Mirzapur is a village in the Shaheed Bhagat Singh Nagar district of Punjab State, India. The village is administrated by Sarpanch, an elected representative of the village.

Demography 
As of 2011, Mirzapur had a total of 41 houses and population of 201, of which 107 were males while 94 were females, according to the report published by Census India in 2011. The literacy rate of Mirzapur is 60.23% lower than the state average of 75.84%. The population of children under the age of 6 years is 25, which is 12.44% of total population of Mirzapur, and child sex ratio is approximately 786, compared to the Punjab state average of 846.

Most of the people are from Schedule Caste, which constitutes 34.33% of total population in Mirzapur. The town does not have any Schedule Tribe population so far.

As per the report published by Census India in 2011, 72 people were engaged in work activities out of the total population of Mirzapur, which includes 67 males and 5 females. According to census survey report 2011, 97.22% workers describe their work as main work and 2.78% workers are involved in marginal activity providing livelihood for less than 6 months.

Education 
KC Engineering College and Doaba Khalsa Trust Group Of Institutions are the nearest colleges.

List of schools nearby:
Dashmesh Model School, Kahma
Govt Primary School, Kahlon
Govt High School, Garcha

Transport 

See also 
List of villages in India

References

External links 
 Tourism of Punjab
 Census of Punjab
 Locality Based PINCode

Villages in Shaheed Bhagat Singh Nagar district